The European golden plover (Pluvialis apricaria), also known as the European golden-plover, Eurasian golden plover, or just the golden plover within Europe, is a largish plover. This species is similar to two other golden plovers: the American golden plover, Pluvialis dominica, and Pacific golden plover, Pluvialis fulva, which are both smaller, slimmer and relatively longer-legged than European golden plover, and both have grey rather than white axillary feathers (only properly visible in flight).

Taxonomy
The European golden plover was formally described by the Swedish naturalist Carl Linnaeus in 1758 in the tenth edition of his Systema Naturae. He placed it with the other plovers in the genus Charadrius and coined the binomial name Charadrius apricarius. The species is now placed in the genus Pluvialis that was introduced in 1760 by the French zoologist  Mathurin Jacques Brisson. The genus name is Latin and means "relating to rain", from pluvia, "rain".  It was believed that golden plovers flocked when rain was imminent.  The species name  apricaria is Latin and means "to bask in the sun". The European golden plover is monotypic: no subspecies are recognised.

Description

The European golden plover is quite thickset, with its wings only being slightly longer than its tail. Its most distinct feature is a white "s"-shaped band stretching from its forehead to its flanks.

Distribution and habitat
The European golden plover tends to breed in the Arctic tundra and other palearctic areas, ranging as far west as Iceland, where they are called Heiðlóa, and as far east as central Siberia. It tends to gather in large flocks and winter in open areas, agricultural plains, ploughed land, and short meadows, ranging from Europe to North Africa.

In the United Kingdom, golden plover chicks rely on Tipulidae for feeding, while in Sweden Bibionidae are more important.

Behaviour and ecology

The European golden plover's call is a monosyllabic, slightly descending, melancholic "tuu".

Its flight action is rapid and powerful, with regular wingbeats.

In culture

Folklore
The European golden plover spends summers in Iceland, and in Icelandic folklore, the appearance of the first plover in the country means that spring has arrived. The Icelandic media always covers the first plover sighting, which in 2017, took place on March 27. In 2020, the first golden plover was sighted on March 16.

Origin of Guinness World Records
On 10 November 1951, Sir Hugh Beaver, then the managing director of the Guinness Breweries, went on a shooting party in the North Slob, by the River Slaney in County Wexford, Ireland. After missing a shot at a Eurasian golden plover, he became involved in an argument over which was the fastest game bird in Europe, the golden plover or the red grouse (the former being correct). That evening at Castlebridge House, he realised that it was impossible to confirm in reference books whether or not the golden plover was Europe's fastest game bird. Beaver knew that there must be numerous other questions debated nightly in pubs throughout Ireland, but there was no book in the world with which to settle arguments about records. He realised then that a book supplying the answers to this sort of question might prove popular. A Guinness employee told Sir Hugh of two twin brothers, Norris  and Ross McWhirter, who had opened a fact checking agency in London.  Sir Hugh interviewed the brothers and, impressed by their prodigious knowledge, commissioned the book. Later, he published the first Guinness World Records which became a best seller within months.

Status
The European golden plover is one of the species to which the Agreement on the Conservation of African-Eurasian Migratory Waterbirds (AEWA) applies.

References

External links

 Ageing and sexing (PDF; 1.4 MB) by Javier Blasco-Zumeta & Gerd-Michael Heinze
 
 
 
 
 
 
 

European golden plover
Birds of Europe
Birds of Iceland
Birds of Scandinavia
Birds of Russia
European golden plover
Taxa named by Carl Linnaeus